José Goyeneche (born 15 October 1941) is a former Spanish cyclist. He competed in the team time trial at the 1964 Summer Olympics. He also rode in the 1967 Tour de France and two editions of the Vuelta a España.

Major results
1966
 1st  Overall Cinturón a Mallorca
 3rd Vuelta a Cantabria
1968
 1st Stage 1 Vuelta a los Valles Mineros
 2nd Overall Vuelta a La Rioja
 10th Trofeo Masferrer

References

External links
 

1941 births
Living people
People from Mungialdea
Spanish male cyclists
Olympic cyclists of Spain
Cyclists from the Basque Country (autonomous community)
Cyclists at the 1964 Summer Olympics
Sportspeople from Biscay